Michel Aebischer (born 6 January 1997) is a Swiss professional footballer who plays as a midfielder for Italian club Bologna and the Switzerland national team.

Club career 
Aebischer is a youth exponent from Young Boys. He made his Swiss Super League debut on 10 September 2016 against Luzern.

He was part of the Young Boys squad that won the 2017–18 Swiss Super League, their first league title for 32 years.

On 25 January 2022, he joined Bologna in Italy. The transfer is initially a loan with a future obligation to buy the rights permanently.

International career
Aebischer made his debut for Switzerland national team on 18 November 2019 in a Euro 2020 qualifier against Gibraltar. He substituted Ruben Vargas in the 85th minute.

Career statistics

Club

Honours
Young Boys
 Swiss Super League: 2017–18, 2018–19, 2019–20
 Swiss Cup: 2019–20

External links

References

1997 births
Living people
Association football midfielders
Swiss men's footballers
Switzerland youth international footballers
Switzerland under-21 international footballers
Switzerland international footballers
BSC Young Boys players
Bologna F.C. 1909 players
Swiss Super League players
Serie A players
2022 FIFA World Cup players
Swiss expatriate footballers
Expatriate footballers in Italy
Swiss expatriate sportspeople in Italy
People from Fribourg
Sportspeople from the canton of Fribourg